Verónica Jaspeado Martínez (born September 6, 1976) is a Mexican actress and voice actress.

Biography
She was born in Puebla, Mexico on September 6, 1976. Veronica studied at the Centro de Capacitación Artística de Televisa (CEA). She also participated in the Acrobatics workshop at Centro Universitario de Teatro (CUT), of the UNAM. She has a sister. She has a band called DKDA and wrote the song- "Pólvora Mojada". In 1994, she won the title of Nuestra Belleza Tlaxcala 1994, advancing her to that year's Miss Universe qualification finals for Mexico, Nuestra Belleza México 1994.

Career
Jaspeado, who has modeled at national level, received her first opportunity as an actress in the telenovela DKDA: Sueños de juventud (1999), in which she played the role of Camila Saldivar. Two years later, Jaspeado got her second chance on the small screen to participate in El Derecho de Nacer (2001). She participated in La Otra, and "Amor mío". Jaspeado made her debut in the musical comedy "Los muchachos de Nueva York" and later worked in Anastasia, the musical. This work led her to be recognized by the PTCA as "Revelación en teatro 1999". Professionalism and perseverance were the perfect combination for Jaspeado to be able to work under the guidance of 'Mr. Telenovela', Ernesto Alonso, in the melodrama Amarte es mi pecado.  She shared credits with the great performance figures as Aaron Hernan, Macaria, Tiare Scanda and Odysseus Bichir, among others. She was involved in "Un Gancho al Corazón" as Ximena Sermeño, with Danna García and Sebastián Rulli. Jaspeado portrayed Josefina Valverde in "Lo Que La Vida Me Robo". In mid-2016 she was cast as "Sonia" for the telenovela Vino el amor (2016). She dubbed Cruz Ramírez at the 2017 animated film Cars 3.

Television series
 La herencia - (2022) Bertha
 La desalmada - (2021) Juana Durán
 Papá a toda madre - (2017-2018) Verónica Valencia de Barrientos
 Vino el amor - (2016-2017) Sonia Ortiz
 Lo que la vida me robó - (2013-2014) Josefina "Finita, Josefa" Valverde de Mendoza / de Argüelles
 Verano de amor - (2009) Greta Perea Olmos
 Un gancho al corazón - (2008–2009) Ximena Sermeño
 Mujeres asesinas -(2008) Claudia
 Amor mío - Vera Esmeralda (2006–2007)
 Mujer, casos de la vida real(2001–2002)
 Amarte es mi pecado (2004) - Mirta Fernández
 Casting... Busco fama (2003)
 La otra - (2002) Apolonia Portugal
 El derecho de nacer - (2001) Teté Puk de la Reguera
 DKDA: Sueños de juventud (1999) - Camila #eme15
The Vow (2022) as herself

References

External links

1976 births
Mexican telenovela actresses
NXIVM people
People from Puebla
Living people